Madyina Ngulube (born 18 June 1996) is a Malawian footballer who plays as a midfielder for DD Sunshine and the Malawi women's national team.

Club career
Ngulube has played for DD Sunshine in Malawi.

International career
Ngulube capped for Malawi at senior level during two COSAFA Women's Championship editions (2020 and 2021).

References

External links

1996 births
Living people
People from Lilongwe
Malawian women's footballers
Women's association football midfielders
Malawi women's international footballers